Eric George Lopez, known professionally as Ericdoa (stylized in all lowercase), is an American singer, songwriter, and record producer. He is known as one of the central artists in the hyperpop or digicore genres of music.

Career 
The Connecticut-born Panamanian-Puerto Rican Ericdoa started recording his own music and releasing it on sites such as SoundCloud, with his debut EP DOA being released in 2019. Ericdoa's debut album, Public Target, as well as his second album, COA, were both released in 2020.

Ericdoa signed with Interscope Records in 2021. He released a number of singles throughout 2021 and early 2022, including Fantasize, back n forth, strangers, sad4whattt, fool4love, and lifeline; sad4whattt was included on the second season soundtrack of the HBO drama series Euphoria. Ericdoa has also frequently collaborated with Glaive, releasing several singles as well as the EP Then I'll Be Happy in 2021.

Ericdoa's fourth album, Things With Wings, was announced for release in May 2022 alongside an international headlining tour. It was later released on May 20th, 2022.

After a nine-month hiatus, Ericdoa released a new single titled ">one" (pronounced "greater than one") on March 5, 2023, in collaboration with Riot Games and Valorant.

Musical style 
While frequently described as a leading Hyperpop and digicore artist, Ericdoa has said that he is hesitant to place a genre on his music. He stated to Vice Media that "I think for people who aren't very well-versed in music it's just a cushion to fall back on ... Instead of genre-less music, they have something to call it." According to The New Yorker, Ericdoa's musical style might be more accurately described as "hyper-rap".

Discography

Studio albums

Extended plays

References

External links 

 

2002 births
Living people
Musicians from Connecticut
Songwriters from Connecticut
Rappers from Connecticut
American singer-songwriters
Interscope Records artists
Hyperpop musicians